Paraguay competed at the 2011 Pan American Games in Guadalajara, Mexico from October 14 to 30, 2011. Gerardo Paniagua was the Chef de mission. Ben Hockin, a swimmer who won multiple medals at the 2010 South American Games was selected to carry the flag during the opening ceremonies. Paraguay's delegation consisted of 28 athletes in 10 sports.

Medalists

Athletics

Paraguay qualified five athletes (four female and one male).

Men

Women

Women

Roller skating

Paraguay qualified one female athlete in artistic roller skating.

Women

Rowing

Paraguay qualified two athletes in the rowing competition (one male and one female).

Men

Women

Shooting

Paraguay qualified two shooters.

Men

Squash

Paraguay qualified three athletes in the squash competition.

Men

Swimming

Paraguay qualified six swimmers (five male and one female).

Men

Women

Table tennis

Paraguay qualified one male athlete in table tennis.

Men

Taekwondo

Paraguay received one wild card in taekwondo.

Men

Tennis

Paraguay qualified five tennis players (three male and two female).

Men

Women

Mixed

Triathlon

Paraguay received one wild card in the women's event.

Women

References

Nations at the 2011 Pan American Games
P
2011